Lone Rock may refer to the following places:

Canada
 Lone Rock, Saskatchewan

United States
 Lone Rock, Iowa
 Lone Rock (Glen Canyon National Recreation Area)
 Lone Rock, Washington
 Lone Rock, Wisconsin, a village
 Lone Rock, Juneau County, Wisconsin, an unincorporated community